This is a list of all Magic: The Gathering players who have acquired 100 or more pro points over the course of their career. After a player has won 100 pro points, he or she is allowed to vote for the Hall of Fame. Until 2013 that player would also be available to be voted into the Hall of Fame, but beginning with the 2014 voting this threshold has been increased to 150 pro points. In addition players aren't eligible for the Hall of Fame until 9 years after their debut on the pro tour. This list compiles the most important statistics about these pro players: Their name, nationality, the number of Pro Tours won, the number of Pro Tour top 8 finishes, their best finish at a Pro Tour, the number of Grand Prix won, the number of Grand Prix top 8 finishes, their best Grand Prix finish, their lifetime pro points, and their Pro Tour debut. Statistics are up to date as of 11 May 2017.

Key

As of 11 May 2017

Notes 

 David Brucker finished 6th with teammates Sebastian Thaler and Helmut Summersberger at 2006 Pro Tour Charleston. For team events, top 4 finishes are regarded as equivalent to an individual top 8 finish as the final elimination stage involves four teams.
 Igor Frayman finished 7th with teammates Gabriel Tsang and Brian Hacker at 2000 Pro Tour New York. For team events, top 4 finishes are regarded as equivalent to an individual top 8 finish as the final elimination stage involves four teams.
 Sam Gomersall finished 5th with teammates John Larkin and Patrick Mello at 2003 Pro Tour Boston. For team events, top 4 finishes are regarded as equivalent to an individual top 8 finish as the final elimination stage involves four teams.
 Robert Jurkovic finished 6th with teammate Arnost Zidek at 2007 Pro Tour San Diego. For team events, top 4 finishes are regarded as equivalent to an individual top 8 finish as the final elimination stage involves four teams.
 Rogier Maaten and Wessel Oomens finished 6th with teammate Julien Nuijten at 2005 Pro Tour Atlanta. For team events, top 4 finishes are regarded as equivalent to an individual top 8 finish as the final elimination stage involves four teams.
 Pierre Malherbaud finished 7th with teammates Thomas Shaw and Karim Aouidad at 2002 Pro Tour Boston. For team events, top 4 finishes are regarded as equivalent to an individual top 8 finish as the final elimination stage involves four teams.
 Antoine Menard finished 8th with teammates Dario Minieri and Nicolas Labarre at 2003 Pro Tour Boston. For team events, top 4 finishes are regarded as equivalent to an individual top 8 finish as the final elimination stage involves four teams.
 Joshua Ravitz finished 8th with teammates Igor Frayman and Chris Pikula at 2004 Pro Tour Seattle. For team events, top 4 finishes are regarded as equivalent to an individual top 8 finish as the final elimination stage involves four teams.
 Sebastian Thaler's Grand Prix achievements are listed under the name Sebastian Aljiaj.

References